Seitsentahokas is the fourteenth album by the Finnish rock group CMX. It was released in 2013 and ranked as most sold album on The Official Finnish Charts.

Seitsentahokas is the first album with Olli-Matti Wahlström, as their former drummer Tuomas Peippo left after their previous album, "Iäti".

Compared to their previous effort, Seitsentahokas is more diverse. To that end, first single "Kusimyrsky" is more progressive and heavy while second single "Rikkisuudeltu" is simpler and more pop-based.

Track listing
Lyrics by A. W. Yrjänä; music as noted. Arrangements by CMX and Rauli Eskolin.

 Valoruumis – 04:19 (music Yrjänä – Janne Halmkrona – Timo Rasio)
 Etuvartio – 03:33 (music Yrjänä – Halmkrona – Rasio)
 En tahdo nähdä enää yhtään alastonta – 05:10 (music Yrjänä)
 Luotisuora – 04:32 (music Yrjänä – Rasio)
 Nrsisti – 04:57 (music Yrjänä)
 Kusimyrsky – 08:01 (music Yrjänä – Halmkrona – Rasio)
 Rikkisuudeltu – 03:47 (music Yrjänä – Halmkrona – Rasio)
 Me tulemme kaikkialta – 05:34 (music Yrjänä – Halmkrona – Rasio)
 Jyrsijä – 04:10 (music Yrjänä – Halmkrona – Rasio)
 Seitsentahokas – 06:31 (music Yrjänä)

Singles 
 Kusimyrsky (30.11.2012)
 Rikkisuudeltu (25.1.2013)

Personnel

 A. W. Yrjänä – vocals, bass
 Janne Halmkrona – guitar
 Timo Rasio – guitar
 Olli-Matti Wahlström – drums
 Raili "Rake" Eskolin – production, sounding and mixing

See also 
 CMX discography

References
 https://web.archive.org/web/20140914022321/http://cmx.fi/levyt/index.php?album=seitsentahokas&type=album 

CMX (band) albums
2013 albums